The ZR engine is a family of straight-four 16-valve all-aluminum and water cooled gasoline engines with a die-cast aluminum block developed by Toyota Motor Corporation, produced from 2007. Engines displace from 1.6 to 2.0 liters. Most engines in this family are equipped with Toyota's dual VVT-i technology that optimizes both intake and exhaust valve timing. This engine family is also the first to use Toyota's Valvematic system, first appearing on the Noah and Voxy in 2007 and then the European Avensis in 2009.

1ZR-FE

The Toyota 1ZR-FE is a DOHC, 16-valve,  engine equipped with dual VVT-i.
This engine is available with either manual gearbox (5 or 6 Speed), a "multi-mode" manual transmission (MM-T 5 Speed) or an automatic gearbox (4 Speed). This new engine is now replacing the 3ZZ-FE engine in most applications.

Specifications
 Engine type : In-Line 4-cylinder DOHC 16-valve
 Bore x Stroke : 
 Compression Ratio : 10.2:1

Applications
  Toyota Auris (ZRE151) (Europe only)
  Toyota Corolla EX (ZRE120) (China only)
  Toyota Corolla (ZRE140, ZRE151) (Europe, Middle East)
  Toyota Corolla Altis (ZRE141) (Facelift; Asia only)

1ZR-FAE
The Toyota 1ZR-FAE is a DOHC, 16-valve,  engine also equipped with Dual VVT-i and Valvematic. Compression ratio has been increased to 10.7:1, red line is at 6600 rpm. Valvematic varies the intake valve lift between  according to load and RPM.

Applications
  Toyota Auris (ZRE151) (Europe only)
  Toyota Corolla (ZRE181) (Europe only)
  Toyota Corolla Altis (ZRE171) (Asia only)
  Toyota Corolla Altis (E210) 2019–current
  Toyota Avensis (ZRT270)
  Toyota Verso (ZGR20)
  Lotus Elise (2010–2021)

1ZR-FBE
The Toyota 1ZR-FBE is a flex fuel version of the 1ZR-FE the DOHC, 16-valve,  engine also equipped with Dual VVT-i and Valvematic.

Applications
  Toyota Corolla (ZRE170) (Southeast Asia only)
  Toyota Corolla Altis (E210) 2019–current (Southeast Asia only)

2ZR-FE
The Toyota 2ZR-FE is a DOHC, 16-valve,  engine also equipped with Dual VVT-i.

This new engine is now replacing the 1ZZ-FE engine in most applications.

Specifications
 Engine Type : In-Line 4-cylinder DOHC 16-valve
  Bore × Stroke = 
 Compression Ratio : 10.0:1
 Weight : , without fuel
   fuel consumption (10-15 Australia & New Zealand test cycle)

Applications
  Toyota Allion (ZRT260/265) 2007-2009
  Toyota Premio (ZRT260/265) 2007-2009
  Toyota Corolla (ZRE142/152)
  Toyota Corolla (ZRE172) ( for all markets except  Corolla Altis for Asia-Pacific market)
  Toyota Corolla Axio/Fielder (NZE141) (Japan only)
  Toyota Corolla Axio/Fielder (NZE161) (Japan only)
  Toyota Corolla Hatchback (ZRE182)
  Toyota Corolla Cross (ZSG10)
  Toyota Auris (ZRE152/154)
  Toyota Yaris T Sport (ZSP90) (Europe only)
  Toyota Matrix/Pontiac Vibe (ZRE142) (North America only)
  Toyota Yaris GRMN with supercharger
  Scion xD (ZSP110)
  Lotus Elise with supercharger
  Junpai D60

2ZR-FAE

The Toyota 2ZR-FAE is a DOHC, 16-valve,  this engine adopts the Valvematic system.
This all-new engine is progressively replacing the 1ZZ-FED and 2ZR-FE engine in most applications.
Compression ratio is 10.5:1 and redline is at 6600 rpm.
The engine consumes 5–10% less fuel than the 2ZR-FE depending on the application.

A special version of the 2ZR-FAE was introduced by Toyota in 2016 for the Taiwanese version of the Toyota Sienta.

Applications
  Toyota Auris (ZRE152) (Europe and Japan only)
  Toyota Avensis (ZRT271)
  Toyota Corolla LE Eco only (2014–2019) (ZRE172); L, LE, and XLE trims (2019–current) (ZRE212)
  Toyota Corolla Sedan & Corolla Touring (Japan 2019–current) (ZRE212/212W)
  Toyota Corolla Rumion (ZRE152/154) (Japan only)
  Toyota Levin (ZRE172/212) (China only) 2014–current
  Toyota iSt (ZSP110) (Japan only)
  Toyota Wish (ZGE20/25)
  Toyota Verso (ZGR21)
  Toyota Allion (ZRT260/265) 2010–current
  Toyota Premio (ZRT260/265) 2010–current
  Scion iM 2016
  Toyota Corolla iM 2017-2018
  Toyota Sienta (ZSP170) October 2016–present (Taiwan only)
  Toyota Corolla Cross (ZSG10, Japan only)

2ZR-FBE
The Toyota 2ZR-FBE is A flex fuel version of the 2ZR-FE the DOHC, 16-valve,  engine also equipped with Dual VVT-i and Valvematic.

Applications
  Toyota Corolla Altis (E140) 2012–2013
  Toyota Corolla (ZRE170)
  Toyota C-HR (NGX10) 2018–present / 2018–2021 (Thailand)
  Toyota Corolla Altis (ZRE211) 2019–present
  Toyota Corolla Cross (ZSG10)

2ZR-FXE
The Toyota 2ZR-FXE is a  Atkinson cycle variant of the 2ZR-FE. It has the same bore and stroke, but the compression ratio is increased to 13.0:1, and the inlet valve closing is late-staged. The net result is that the engine has a greater effective expansion than compression.
Maximum thermal efficiency is about 38.5%.

Maximum thermal efficiency is about 40%.

Applications
 Toyota Auris  — E180 (2011–2018)
 Toyota C-HR/IZOA — AX10/AX50 (2016–present)
 Toyota Corolla — E210 (2018–present)
 Toyota Auris — E210 (2018–2020)
 Toyota Levin — E210 (2019–present)
 Suzuki Swace — E210 (2020–present)
 Toyota Corolla Cross — XG10 (2020–present)
 Toyota Noah/Voxy — R80 (2014–2021), R90 (2022–present)
 Toyota Esquire — R80 (2014–2021)
 Suzuki Landy — R90 (2022–present)
 Toyota Prius
 XW30 (Third generation) (2009–2014)
 XW50 (Fourth generation) (2015–2022)
 XW60 (Fifth generation) (2022–present)
 Toyota Prius Plug-in Hybrid/Prime
 XW30 (First generation) (2012–2014)
 XW50 (Second generation) (2015–2022)
 Toyota Prius v — ZVW40/41 (2012–2017)
 Lexus CT — ZWA10 (2011–present)

3ZR-FE
The Toyota 3ZR-FE is a  DOHC, 16-valve engine with Dual VVT-i.

Specifications
Engine type : In-Line 4-cylinder DOHC 16-valve
 Bore x Stroke : 
 Compression Ratio : 10.0:1 (Japan)
  at 5600 rpm (Japan)
  at 5800 rpm (Brazil, Flex Fuel Version E22/E100 Fuel)
  of torque at 3900 rpm (Japan)
  @ 4000 rpm (Brazil, Flex Fuel Version E22/E100 Fuel)
  fuel consumption (10-15 Japanese test cycle: Toyota Voxy; Toyota Noah)

Applications

2007 Toyota Voxy (ZRR70/75)
2007 Toyota Noah (ZRR70/75)
 Toyota Avensis (ZRT272) (ex. Europe)
2009 Toyota Corolla Altis (ZRE143) (Asia-Pacific ex. Japan)
2010 Toyota Corolla XEi (E150) (Brazil)
2013 Toyota RAV4 (ZSA42L/44L)
2013 Toyota Corolla (E170) (Middle East)

3ZR-FAE

The 3ZR-FAE is a  DOHC, 16-valve engine that was first used in 2007.
It is Toyota's first engine with the Valvematic variable lift intake system.

Specifications
Engine type : In-Line 4-cylinder DOHC 16-valve
Bore x Stroke : 
 Compression Ratio : 10.0:1
  at 6200 rpm
  of torque 4400 rpm

Applications
 Toyota Allion (ZRT261)
 Toyota Premio (ZRT261)
 Toyota RAV4 (ZSA30/35) (Europe and Central America)
 Toyota Avensis (ZRT272)
 Toyota Wish (ZGE21/22)
 Toyota Noah/Voxy (ZRR70/75)
 Toyota C-HR (ZGX10) (US and Canada only)
 Toyota Harrier (Japan)

3ZR-FBE

Applications
  Toyota Corolla (Brazil, 2010-2019)

4ZR-FE
The Toyota 4ZR-FE is a  DOHC, 16-valve engine with Dual VVT-i. It is very similar to 1ZR-FE.

Applications
  Toyota Corolla EX (ZRE120) (China only)
  Toyota Yaris (ZSP91) (China only)
  Toyota Vios (ZSP92) (China only)

5ZR-FXE

Specifications
 Type: inline 4 cylinder DOHC 16 valve VVT-i Atkinson cycle
 Exhaust volume: 
 Bore x stroke: 
 Compression ratio: 13.0:1
 Output:  at 5,200 rpm; torque:  at 4,000 rpm

Applications
 Prius (China variants)
 CT200h (China variants)

Specification is similar to 2ZR-FXE & a region-coded model due to various reasons.

8ZR-FXE

Specifications
 Type: inline 4 cylinder DOHC 16 valve VVT-i Atkinson cycle
 Exhaust volume: 
 Bore x stroke: 
 Compression ratio: 13.0:1
 Output:  at 5,200 rpm; torque:  at 4,000 rpm

Applications
 2015- Toyota Corolla (E170) hybrid (China variants)
 2015- Toyota Levin (E170) hybrid (China variants)

Production
The 1.6L and 1.8L ZR engines are built in Tianjin FAW Toyota Engine Co., Ltd. (TFTE) Plant No. 2, beginning in April 2007 and in the West Virginia Plant for Corolla's production in the United States and Canada.

See also 

 List of Toyota engines
 List of Toyota transmissions

References

External links
 News Release 27 June 2007, Toyota Launches Fully Redesigned Voxy and Noah
 Toyota reveals new Valvematic technology for ZR engine family
 Toyota China Vios Site

Zr
Straight-four engines
Gasoline engines by model